Montego Bay Sports Complex (sometimes referred to as Catherine Hall Sports Complex) is a multi-purpose sports stadium in the Catherine Hall area of the city of Montego Bay, Jamaica. It is also the former home field for Montego Bay United. The stadium capacity is approximately 7,000.

In April 2011 it hosted the 40th edition of the Carifta Games.

In July 2014, it was announced as a host venue for the CONCACAF U-20 Championship.

In October 2014, the venue was announced the host for the final round of the 2014 Caribbean Cup.

Jamaica hosted the Under-20 Championship in January 2015, with the Montego Bay Stadium one of the two stadium used for the tournament.  The ground hosted a total of 24 games, including the final between Panama and Mexico on 24 January.

References

Football venues in Jamaica
Sports venues in Jamaica
Multi-purpose stadiums
Buildings and structures in Montego Bay
Buildings and structures in Saint James Parish, Jamaica